911 Agamemnon, provisional designation , is a large Jupiter trojan and a suspected binary asteroid from the Greek camp, approximately  in diameter. It was discovered on 19 March 1919, by German astronomer Karl Reinmuth at the Heidelberg Observatory in southwest Germany. The dark D-type asteroid is one of the largest Jupiter trojans and has a rotation period of 6.6 hours. It is named after the Greek King Agamemnon, a main character of the Iliad.

Orbit and classification 

Agamemnon is a dark Jovian asteroid orbiting in the Greek camp at Jupiter's leading  Lagrangian point, 60° ahead of its orbit in a 1:1 resonance . It is also a non-family asteroid in the Jovian background population.

It orbits the Sun at a distance of 4.9–5.6 AU once every 12 years and 1 month (4,427 days; semi-major axis of 5.28 AU). Its orbit has an eccentricity of 0.07 and an inclination of 22° with respect to the ecliptic. The body's observation arc begins at Heidelberg in October 1927, more than 8 years after its official discovery observation.

Physical characteristics 

In the Tholen classification, Agamemnon is a dark D-type asteroid. It has also been characterized as a D-type in both the Tholen- and SMASS-like taxonomy of the Small Solar System Objects Spectroscopic Survey (S3OS2).

Rotation period 

Photometric observations of this asteroid during 1997 were used to build a lightcurve showing a rotation period of  hours with a brightness variation of  magnitude. A 2009 study yielded a period of  hours, in reasonable agreement with the previous result.

Diameter and albedo 

According to the surveys carried out by the Infrared Astronomical Satellite IRAS, the Japanese Akari satellite and the NEOWISE mission of NASA's Wide-field Infrared Survey Explorer, Agamemnon measures between 131.04 and 185.30 kilometers in diameter, based on a common absolute magnitude of 7.89 and a surface albedo between 0.037 and 0.072. A concurring diameter estimate of  kilometers from an occultation event (see below) has also been obtained. The Collaborative Asteroid Lightcurve Link agrees with the results obtained by IRAS, that is, an albedo of 0.0444 and a diameter of 166.66 kilometers based on an absolute magnitude of 7.89.

Shape and satellite 

Naming 

This minor planet named from Greek mythology after King Agamemnon, the leader of the Greeks in the Trojan War. He is a main character of Homer's Iliad. The official naming citation was mentioned in The Names of the Minor Planets by Paul Herget in 1955.

Notes

References

External links 
  
 Asteroid Lightcurve Database (LCDB), query form (info )
 Dictionary of Minor Planet Names, Google books
 Discovery Circumstances: Numbered Minor Planets (1)-(5000) – Minor Planet Center
 
 

000911
Discoveries by Karl Wilhelm Reinmuth
Named minor planets
000911
19190319
Agamemnon